Fregosi is a surname. Notable people with the surname include:

Carlo Fregosi (1890–1968), Italian gymnast
Jim Fregosi (1942–2014), American baseball player and manager